The boys' 500 metres in short track speed skating at the 2020 Winter Youth Olympics was held on 20 January at the Lausanne Skating Arena.

Results

Heats 
 Q – qualified for the quarterfinals
 PEN – penalty

Quarterfinals 
 Q – qualified for the semifinals
 YC – yellow card

Semifinals 
 QA – qualified for Final A
 QB – qualified for Final B

Final B

Final A 
The final A was held at 15:20.

References 

Boys' 500m